James Wilfred "Buddy" Wentworth (17 January 1937 – 4 June 2014) was a Namibian politician. He was a member of the SWAPO fraction of the Constituent Assembly of Namibia and served as Deputy Minister in several education-related portfolios in the first, second and third National Assemblies of Namibia. At the time he retired in 2005 he was one of two longest serving Deputy Ministers of Namibia.

Wentworth came to Namibia from South Africa in 1970 and worked as teacher in Rehoboth, and as school principal at Tamariskia Primary School, Swakopmund. He joined SWAPO in 1972.

Wentworth was a founding chairperson of the Franco-Namibian Cultural Centre in Windhoek, and chaired the National Commission for Unesco. He was a practicing Muslim. He was married twice, and had 10 children. He was a recipient of the Ordre des Palmes Académiques for his contribution to the Namibian independence struggle. He died of heart failure on 4 June 2014 at his home in Olympia, Windhoek, aged 77.

References

1937 births
2014 deaths
Members of the National Assembly (Namibia)
SWAPO politicians
Government ministers of Namibia
Place of birth missing
Disease-related deaths in Namibia
Namibian Muslims
Recipients of the Ordre des Palmes Académiques